The Attack on Anzac Cove can refer to;

First attack on Anzac Cove 25 April 1915
Second attack on Anzac Cove 27–28 April 1915
Third attack on Anzac Cove 19 May 1915